Olof Sixten "Olle" Ohlsson (October 4, 1888 – July 21, 1962) was a Swedish football player who competed in the 1908 Summer Olympics. In the 1908 tournament he was a part of the Swedish football team that finished in fourth place.

References

1888 births
1962 deaths
Swedish footballers
Sweden international footballers
Olympic footballers of Sweden
Footballers at the 1908 Summer Olympics
Association football midfielders